Felix Gary Gray (born July 17, 1969) is an American film director, film producer, and music video director. Gray began his career as a director on numerous critically acclaimed and award-winning music videos, including "It Was a Good Day" by Ice Cube, "Natural Born Killaz" by Dr. Dre and Ice Cube, "Keep Their Heads Ringin'" by Dr. Dre, "Waterfalls" by TLC, and "Ms. Jackson" by Outkast.

Gray made his feature film directorial debut with the comedy Friday (1995). He has since directed the films Set It Off (1996), The Negotiator (1998), The Italian Job (2003), Be Cool (2005), Law Abiding Citizen (2009), and Straight Outta Compton (2015). He also directed the eighth installment of the Fast & Furious franchise, The Fate of the Furious (2017), which is the 22nd-highest-grossing film of all time.

Early life
Gray was born in New York City and raised primarily in South Los Angeles. He decided at the age of sixteen that he would become a filmmaker, having discovered a natural talent for the video camera with his AV class in high school.

Career
Seeking out a step-by-step process, he planned to work a number of years in the film industry as an assistant and hoped to work his first feature by the time he had turned 45. As such, he started working as soon as he left high school, working as a camera operator on programs such as Screen Scene. He also had a bit part in the comedy Major League (1989). He got his first chance to direct with music videos, starting with a video for the hip-hop group WC and the Maad Circle (WC was a former classmate of his). In 1993, he directed the music video for Ice Cube's "It Was a Good Day". The video is a literal adaptation of the lyrics. He would go on to direct subsequent videos for Ice Cube, as well as artists such as Cypress Hill, Outkast, Dr. Dre, and Queen Latifah. At age 26, Gray directed his first film, the buddy stoner comedy Friday with rapper-producer Ice Cube (who co-wrote the film based on his experiences in Los Angeles) and Chris Tucker. Next, he directed the film Set It Off, with Jada Pinkett and Queen Latifah. He then directed The Negotiator, which starred Kevin Spacey and Samuel L. Jackson while earning Gray both Best Film and Best Director awards at the 1998 Acapulco Film Festival.

Gray directed The Italian Job, a 2003 action-thriller starring Charlize Theron and Mark Wahlberg. Gray garnered the Best Director award at the 2004 Black American Film Festival for his work on the film, which surpassed the $100 million mark in the domestic box office. His next film was A Man Apart, an action thriller starring Vin Diesel. He would later direct Be Cool, an adaptation of Elmore Leonard's novel of the same name. The John Travolta vehicle was panned by critics but went on to gross over $95 million worldwide.

He then directed the thriller Law Abiding Citizen, starring Jamie Foxx and Gerard Butler and written by Kurt Wimmer. The film grossed over $100 million worldwide. Gray received the Ivan Dixon Award of Achievement from the Black Hollywood Education and Resource Center and was named one of the "50 Best and Brightest African Americans Under 40" by Black Enterprise magazine. He was honored by the African American Film Critics Association with their 2004 Special Achievement Award and was recognized by the Artist Empowerment Coalition with the Artist Empowerment Award that same year. He also received the Pioneer Director award from the Pan-African Film and Arts Festival in 2010.

Gray directed the 2015 drama Straight Outta Compton, a biographical film about the rap group N.W.A. In 2017, Gray directed The Fate of the Furious, the eighth film in the Fast & Furious franchise, which was released on April 14, 2017. Upon release, both films set the record for best opening by a film with a black director and The Fate of the Furious became the first film directed by an African-American to gross over $1 billion worldwide. In April 2019, it was revealed that Gray would direct an adaptation of the video game franchise Saints Row, with a screenplay written by Greg Russo. In September 2021, it was announced that he would direct the heist film Lift starring Kevin Hart for Netflix.

Filmography

Feature films

Cameo roles

Television

Music videos

References

External links 
 
 

1969 births
Living people
20th-century African-American people
21st-century African-American people
Action film directors
African-American film directors
African-American film producers
African-American television producers
American film producers
American music video directors
American television producers
Film directors from New York City
Film producers from New York (state)